Lie Die is the second EP by Australian indie pop band Angelas Dish. The EP was released in 2005, through Boomtown Records.

In 2010, Kill Your Stereo said "When Angelas Dish released the Lie Die EP in 2005 it was obvious that this would be a band with longevity, in a scene that had so few. That record was fantastic, there was not a single thing wrong with it, and it quickly gained the band a slew of big name support tours which introduced them to many new fans."

Track list

Release history

References

2005 EPs
Angelas Dish albums